Griffith Jones may refer to:

Griffith Jones (Llanddowror) (1684–1761), Llanddowror, who established circulating schools in Wales
Ysgol Griffith Jones, Carmarthenshire, UK, a school named after the educator
Griffith Jones (mayor), appointed to the Supreme Court of Pennsylvania in 1690, later Mayor of Philadelphia
Griffith Jones (actor) (1909–2007), actor, who played Caryl Sanger in the film Escape Me Never (1935)
Griffith Jones (priest) (1684–1761), Welsh Anglican priest who promoted Methodism
Griffith Arthur Jones (1827–1906), Welsh Anglican priest
Griffith Hartwell Jones (died 1944), Professor of Latin at the University of Wales, Cardiff
Griff Rhys Jones, British comedian, writer, and actor
Griffith Rhys Jones (1834-1897), Welsh conductor
Mervyn Griffith-Jones (1909-1979), British lawyer and judge

See also
Griffin Jones (disambiguation)